Villa del Bosco is a comune (municipality) in the Province of Biella in the Italian region Piedmont, located about  northeast of Turin and about  northeast of Biella.

Villa del Bosco borders the following municipalities: Curino, Lozzolo, Roasio, Sostegno.

References

Cities and towns in Piedmont